The Filmfare Best Editing Award is given by the Filmfare magazine as part of its annual Filmfare Awards for Hindi films.

Superlatives
Most Awards

 Sreekar Prasad – 4
 Hrishikesh Mukherjee – 3
 Raj Kapoor – 3
 Sanjay Verma – 3   
 Kamlakar Karkhanis – 2
 Renu Saluja – 2
 V. N. Mayekar – 2
 M. S. Shinde – 2
 B. S. Glaad – 2
 Keshav Naidu – 2
 G. G. Mayekar – 2
 Namrata Rao – 2

List

See also
 Filmfare Award's
 Bollywood
 Cinema of India

References

External links
 Filmfare Nominees and Winners
Filmfare Awards Best Editing

Editing
Film editing awards